Cerca-la-Source is a commune in the Cerca-la-Source Arrondissement, in the Centre department of Haiti.

References

Populated places in Centre (department)
Communes of Haiti